Gumfreston is a parish and small village  from St. Florence and  from Tenby, south Pembrokeshire, Wales. It is in the community of St. Mary Out Liberty. The B4318 is the main road that passes through Gumfreston.

Parish

History
The parish appears on a 1578 parish map of Pembrokeshire. There are a few houses in the village, but no other significant settlements in the mainly rural parish from a pre-1850 map. In 1833 the parish was reported as having 103 inhabitants. Coal was worked on a small scale for local use. The village is recorded as a historic place name by the Royal Commission in the early 20th century. There are three named farms on modern maps: Daisy Back Farm, Glebe Farm and Gumfreston Farm, and a farm complex named North Astridge and South Astridge.

Feudal title
The ancient feudal title of the Manor of Wedlock, or Wydeloc, resides in the parish but is not associated with a manor house or land. The title was sold at auction in Cardiff in December 2016 for £2,000.

Church
The small church St Lawrence's, with its tall tower, is mediaeval. The church is significant for the historic architecture, for a medieval wall painting, and for the three nearby springs reputed to be ancient healing wells that attract visitors from many countries.

References

External links

Further historical information and sources on GENUKI

Villages in Pembrokeshire